Stadio Giovanni Chiggiato is a multi-purpose stadium in Caorle, Italy. It is mainly used for football matches and athletics meetings. In September 2014 the Italy national under-18 football team beat the England national under-18 football team 2–0 at the stadium.

References

External links
 Profile at Città di Caorle 

Football venues in Italy
Multi-purpose stadiums in Italy